Vitaliy Komarnytskyi (born 2 August 1981 in Vinnytsia, in the Ukrainian SSR of the Soviet Union) is a retired Ukrainian footballer.

Career
He participated in the 2001 FIFA World Youth Championship. Though raised in the Ukraine, Komarnytskyi spent his formulative football years in Israel.

See also
 2001 FIFA World Youth Championship squads#Ukraine

External links
 
 Profile and statistics of Vitaliy Komarnitskyy on One.co.il

1983 births
Living people
Ukrainian footballers
Ukrainian expatriate footballers
Ukraine under-21 international footballers
Ukraine youth international footballers
Hapoel Petah Tikva F.C. players
Maccabi Acre F.C. players
Hapoel Rishon LeZion F.C. players
Expatriate footballers in Israel
Ukrainian expatriate sportspeople in Israel
FC Dnipro players
FC Metalist Kharkiv players
FC Kharkiv players
FC Kryvbas Kryvyi Rih players
FC Hoverla Uzhhorod players
FC Helios Kharkiv players
Ukrainian Premier League players
FC Nyva Vinnytsia players
FC Fortuna Sharhorod players
Footballers from Vinnytsia
Association football defenders
Ukrainian football managers
FC Helios Kharkiv managers